S40 may refer to:

Aircraft 
 SABCA S.40, a Belgian trainer aircraft
 Sikorsky S-40, an American amphibious flying boat
 Spectrum S-40 Freedom, an American business jet

Automobiles 
 Suzuki Boulevard S40, a Japanese motorcycle
 Toyota Crown (S40), a Japanese luxury car
 Volvo S40, a Swedish automobile

Electronics 
 Canon PowerShot S40, a digital camera
 IBM NetVista S40, a personal computer
 Series 40, a software platform used in Nokia cell phones
 Siemens S40, a mobile phone

Rail and transit 
 S40 (New York City bus)
 S40 (TILO), a regional rail line in Ticino, Switzerland
 S40 (ZVV), a line of the Zürich S-Bahn in Switzerland

Roads 
 County Route S40 (Bergen County, New Jersey)
 New Jersey Route 72, designated Route S40 until 1953

Submarines 
 
 , a submarine of the Royal Navy
 , a submarine of the Indian Navy
 , a submarine of the United States Navy

Other uses 
 S40 Racing, a 1997 freeware game 
 S40: To clean the floor and all objects contaminated by this material use ... (to be specified by the manufacturer), a safety phrase
 Somua S40, a prototype French tank
 Sulfur-40, an isotope of sulfur
 S40, a postcode district in Chesterfield, England